The Network Computing System (NCS) was an implementation of the Network Computing Architecture (NCA). It was created at Apollo Computer in the 1980s. It comprised a set of tools for implementing distributed software applications, or distributed computing.

The design and implementation of DCE/RPC, the remote procedure call mechanism in the Distributed Computing Environment, is based on NCA/NCS. It also was the first implementation of Universally unique identifiers.

References
Kong, Mike, et al. (1987). Network Computing System Reference Manual. Apollo Computer Inc. New Jersey: Prentice Hall. 
Zahn, Lisa, et al. (1990). Network Computing Architecture. Apollo Computer Inc. New Jersey: Prentice Hall. 
Lyons, Tom (1991).  Network Computing System Tutorial. Hewlett-Packard Company, New Jersey: Prentice Hall. 
P. Leach et al. (2005). RFC 4122 — A Universally Unique IDentifier (UUID) URN Namespace. Internet Engineering Task Force.
Internet Protocol based network software